Andong / Antung (Wade-Giles), or Liaodong was a former province in Northeast China, located in what is now part of Liaoning and Jilin provinces. It was bordered on the southeast by the Yalu River, which separated it from Korea.

History
The name of the province Antung in Chinese means "pacify the east" and was likely inspired by the Protectorate General to Pacify the East established during the Tang Dynasty.

Antung Province was first created in 1934 as a province of the Japanese-controlled Empire of Manchukuo, when the former Fengtian Province was divided into three parts: Antung Province, Fengtian Province and Jinzhou Province. Antung was further sub-divided in 1939 into Antung Province and Tonghua Province.

After the annexation of Manchukuo by the Republic of China after the end of World War II, the Kuomintang reunited Antung and Tonghua, and continued to recognize the area as Antung Province. However, under the administration of the People's Republic of China, Antung Province was renamed as Liaodong Province and it was abolished in 1954, and its area was divided between Liaoning Province and Jilin Province.

Administration division
The capital of Antung Province from 1934–1939 was Tonghua, in modern-day Jilin. However, after the 1939 administrative reorganization of the province, the capital moved to Antung, an important border town between Manchukuo and Korea, and a major center on the railroad from Korea to Mukden.

1949–1954

See also 
 
 List of administrative divisions of Manchukuo

External links 
 map of the Andong Province of Manchukuo

Provinces of the Republic of China (1912–1949)
Former provinces of China
Provinces of Manchukuo
States and territories established in 1934
1954 disestablishments in China